Marshall McLuhan Catholic Secondary School (Marshall McLuhan, MMCSS, Marshall McLuhan CSS, or McLuhan) is a coeducational, non-semestered, Catholic high school in midtown Toronto, Ontario, Canada managed by the Toronto Catholic District School Board. The school was formally founded in September 1998 to replace De La Salle College Oaklands campus, founded by the De La Salle Brothers in 1851, which was reverted as a private school in 1994. The school property was originally built for  the Toronto Hunt Club and later used by the Canadian Armed Forces as the Canadian Forces Staff School until 1994.

This school was named after Marshall McLuhan, a Canadian educator, philosopher, and scholar—a professor of English literature, a literary critic, a rhetorician, a communication theorist, and a committed Roman Catholic. McLuhan is located on Avenue Road north of Eglinton Avenue East and is accessible from Eglinton station. Its motto is "Faith is our medium".

History

Toronto Hunt Club
The Toronto Hunt Club was established in by British Army officers of the Toronto garrison (Fort York) in 1843. It held gymkhana equestrian events at various sites around the city. In 1895 it acquired its first permanent home in a rural area east of the city between Kingston Road and the waterfront. In 1898, the streetcar was extended eastward to the site, and soon the area became a cottage district and then streetcar suburb of Toronto. This forced the equestrian activities to move further afield. In 1907, the horses were thus moved to a site in Thornhill (Steeles' Corner at Steeles Avenue and Yonge Street).

In 1919 the club moved to a location closer to town at Eglinton Avenue and Avenue Road. Known as the Eglinton Hunt Club, a polo arena, clubhouses and other facilities were erected. The 1930s saw the club run into financial difficulties.

The original Hunt Club site in Scarborough was turned into a nine-hole golf course in the 1930s, and it remains an exclusive private golfing club today. The current club champion is Chris Jones, as was determined on the annual Champions Day, September 18, 2010.

Air force base
At the height of World War II, the federal government acquired the club, and it became a secret air force research facility known as the No. 1 Clinical Investigation Unit, and later the Royal Canadian Air Force Institute of Aviation Army. Dr. Fredrick G. Banting was employed at the site and conducted research regarding the physiological effects of combat flying. During that time,  noted James Bond author, Ian Fleming was posted to both Camp X in Ajax and to this facility for intelligence officer training.  The name of the church located short walking distance from the training facility at the corner of Avenue Road and Eglington Avenue was named St. James-Bond Church.

Another noted employee, scientist Wilbur R. Franks, developed the world's first anti-Gravity flying suit (G-Suit) at the facility.

Following WWII, the Royal Canadian Air Force stationed squadrons here to defend Toronto during the Cold War. Eventually, the site became a staff school for training, educating over 10,000 officers before finally closing in 1994.

Namesake
Marshall McLuhan was born in Edmonton, Alberta, to Elsie Naomi (née Hall) and Herbert Ernest McLuhan. His brother, Maurice, was born two years later. "Marshall" was a family name: his maternal grandmother's surname. Both of his parents were born in Canada. His mother was a Baptist schoolteacher who later became an actress. His father was a Methodist and had a real estate business in Edmonton. When World War I broke out, the business failed, and McLuhan's father enlisted in the Canadian army. After a year of service he contracted influenza and remained in Canada, away from the front. After Herbert's discharge from the army in 1915, the McLuhan family moved to Winnipeg, Manitoba, where Marshall grew up and went to school, attending Kelvin Technical School before enrolling in the University of Manitoba in 1928.

He is known for coining the expressions the medium is the message and the global village, and for predicting the World Wide Web almost thirty years before it was invented. Although he was a fixture in media discourse in the late 1960s, his influence began to wane in the early 1970s. In the years after his death, he would continue to be a controversial figure in academic circles. With the arrival of the internet, however, there was renewed interest in his work and perspective.

The school

Catholic high school education in North Toronto dates back not far as 1851 when the Institute of the Brothers of the Christian Schools founded De La Salle College. The Brothers, who arrived in Montreal in 1837 and founded the first permanent community of De La Salle Brothers in North America. At the request of Bishop De Charbonnel, five Brothers came to Toronto in 1851 and established a grammar school at the corner of Lombard and Jarvis Streets. In September of that year, the Brothers extended their ministry to St. Paul's School, which is still in existence today. Among their early graduates was Denis O'Connor, who became the 5th Bishop of Toronto in 1899. The Brothers opened their own secondary school in 1863 on Jarvis Street, originally called 'Christian Brothers Commercial Academy'. In 1870, the school was moved to Duke Street and the name was changed to De La Salle Institute. By 1890, the school was extended to include secondary education and was relocated to what was then the Bank of Upper Canada. The name De La Salle Institute was changed to De La Salle College in 1880 when university entrance courses were added to the commercial curriculum. This building still stands at the corner of Adelaide and George Streets as 252 Adelaide Street East and is currently part of George Brown College.

In 1913, De La Salle College took over part of the 67 Bond Street building, right next to St. Michael's Cathedral. The senior section was relocated to De La Salle Moore Park in what is now Our Lady of Perpetual Help School in 1925 when these classes were moved to De La Salle College "Oaklands" in 1932-1933 which had opened in 1931. The land was once part of the Crown Lands deeded to Honourable John Elmsley in 1798. In 1950, after a great deal of effort and sacrifice on the part of the Brothers and the alumni of the school, the present structure was officially opened. De La Salle had always been a completely private school until 1967 when the school were placed under the Metropolitan Separate School Board (now called the Toronto Catholic District School Board) for grades nine and ten. By 1987, when the full funding came in place in 1984, the maintenance, curriculum, funding and control of the entire high school was under the MSSB. With the re-privatization of De La Salle in September 1994 as a co-ed  university preparatory school, there was no catholic high school serving that area, although many students in North Toronto attended Dante Alighieri Academy to the west or Senator O'Connor College School to the east.

To fill in the void with De La Salle's re-privatization, the school board began the process to replace De La Salle. In 1995, the MSSB acquired the 2.7 hectare Canadian Forces Staff School although the homeowners were worried to see their homes expropriated.

The MSSB has approved the name of the new school, Marshall McLuhan Catholic Secondary School on June 13, 1997. During that period, the facility were used before the opening by St. Michael's College School during renovations and the students and staff from St. Anselm Catholic School due to renovations to their school.  On September 29, 1998, McLuhan opened its doors to 100 Grade 9 pupils under its founding principal, Michael Pautler (the school's opening was delayed to two weeks due to the province-wide strike). The first McLuhan students graduated in June 2002. The $14,600,000 addition of an existing military college structure, designed by Global Architects Inc., was completed in February 2001 and its facilities consisted of the cafetorium, gymnasium, library, well-lit atrium, chapel, and multiple computer labs.

Academics 
This school is a composite non-semestered secondary school running from grades 9 to 12. It consists of various academic programs such as mathematics, English, geography, history and science as well as Advanced Placement.

Athletics 
McLuhan offers a wide range of sports that suit the preferences of many students and has committed to run strong Rugby programs, and more recently, Track & Field and Cross Country teams as well. In  other sports, they gained an excellent reputation and compete strongly in all. The school has awarded many titles of their sports achievements by the OFSAA (Ontario Federation of School Athletics Association).

See also
List of high schools in Ontario

References

External links
Marshall McLuhan Catholic Secondary School
TCDSB Portal

Toronto Catholic District School Board
Educational institutions established in 1998
High schools in Toronto
Marshall McLuhan
Catholic secondary schools in Ontario
1998 establishments in Ontario